Bürgermeister Anna is an East German comedy film directed by Hans Müller. It was released in 1950.

Cast
 Eva Rimski as Anna Drews
 Reinhard Kolldehoff as Jupp Ucker
 Catja Görna as Ursel Ucker
 Klaus Becker as Hans Rapp
 Arno Paulsen as Bauer Lehmkuhl
 Lutz Moik as Matthias Lehmkuhl
 Arthur Wiesner as Vater Ucker
 Steffie Spira as Mutter Ucker
 Charlotte Ritter as Mutter Drews
 Gustav Püttjer as Ohm Willem
 Erich Dunskus as Bauer Rau
 Edith Hancke as Grete Drews
 Sigrid Lagemann as Elli Rapp

External links
 

1950 films
1950 comedy films
German comedy films
East German films
1950s German-language films
German black-and-white films
1950s German films